Universidad Mayor is a private university in Santiago, Chile. It was founded in 1988.

Foundation, Growth and Development (1988-2015)

Universidad Mayor opened its first academic programs in 1988 with bachelor's degrees in Architecture and Engineering with 3 majors; Industrial Engineering, Computer Science and Electronics Engineering which were offered at its Main Campus in Américo Vespucio.

Within a few years, Universidad Mayor became the first private university in Chile to offer Agronomy and Forest Engineering (1989), Veterinary Medicine (1991), Dentistry (1997) and a Medical Residency Program (1998).

National and International Accreditation 
It is also the first university in Chile to be internationally accredited by the United States Middle States Commission on Higher Education (MSCHE) which defines, maintains, and promotes educational excellence across institutions and is recognized by the U.S. Secretary of Education to conduct accreditation and pre-accreditation activities for institutions of higher education in DE, DC, MD, NJ, NY, PA, PR, and the US Virgin Islands.

References

External links 
 Official site

Universities in Chile
Mayor
1988 establishments in Chile